The advection upstream splitting method (AUSM) is developed as a numerical inviscid flux function for solving a general system of conservation equations. It is based on the upwind concept and was motivated to provide an alternative approach to other upwind methods, such as the Godunov method, flux difference splitting methods by Roe, and Solomon and Osher, flux vector splitting methods by Van Leer, and Steger and Warming. The AUSM first recognizes that the inviscid flux consist of two physically distinct parts, i.e., convective and pressure fluxes. The former is associated with the flow (advection) speed, while the latter with the acoustic speed; or respectively classified as the linear and nonlinear fields. Currently, the convective and pressure fluxes are formulated using the eigenvalues of the flux Jacobian matrices. Its variants have also been proposed.

Features
The Advection Upstream Splitting Method has many features. The main features are:
accurate capturing of shock and contact discontinuities
entropy-satisfying solution
positivity-preserving solution
algorithmic simplicity (not requiring explicit eigen-structure of the flux Jacobian matrices) and straightforward extension to additional conservation laws
free of “carbuncle” phenomena
uniform accuracy and convergence rate for all Mach numbers.
Since the method does not specifically require eigenvectors, it is especially attractive for the system whose eigen-structure is not known explicitly, as the case of two-fluid equations for multiphase flow.

Applications
The AUSM has been employed to solve a wide range of problems, low-Mach to hypersonic aerodynamics, large eddy simulation and aero-acoustics, direct numerical simulation, multiphase flow, galactic relativistic flow etc.

See also
Euler equations
Finite volume method
Flux limiter
Godunov's theorem
High resolution scheme
Numerical method of lines
Sergei K. Godunov
Total variation diminishing

References

Computational fluid dynamics
Numerical differential equations